The NWA World Light Heavyweight Championship was a professional wrestling championship owned and promoted by the National Wrestling Alliance's Australia territory, World Championship Wrestling.

Title history

See also

Professional wrestling in Australia

References

External links

Professional wrestling in Australia
National Wrestling Alliance championships
Light heavyweight wrestling championships
World Championship Wrestling (Australia) championships